Edward Souza-Neto (September 22, 1921 – May 19, 1979) was an American soccer player who earned at least 7 caps and scored 3 goals for the United States men's national soccer team, and played in the U.S. team's historic 1–0 victory over England in the 1950 FIFA World Cup. Souza was also a member of the U.S. team for the 1948 Summer Olympics.  He played his club soccer with Fall River Ponta Delgada and New York German-Hungarian SC.

Souza was not related to his teammate John Souza.

References

External links
 National Soccer Hall of Fame profile
 

1921 births
1979 deaths
American people of Portuguese descent
Sportspeople from Fall River, Massachusetts
United States men's international soccer players
National Soccer Hall of Fame members
1950 FIFA World Cup players
Footballers at the 1948 Summer Olympics
Olympic soccer players of the United States
Ponta Delgada S.C. players
Soccer players from Massachusetts
American soccer players
Association football forwards